Willie Smith (born November 1, 1937) is a former American football player. A native of Little Rock, Arkansas, Smith attended Dunbar High School, a segregated high school for African-American students.  He was teammates during high school with Jim Pace, and the two of them opted to attend the University of Michigan where they were teammates for the school's football team.  Smith played college football as a tackle for the Michigan Wolverines football team from 1956 to 1958.  He was drafted by the Chicago Bears in the eighth round (94th overall pick) of the 1959 NFL Draft, but he opted instead to play in the American Football League.  Smith appeared in all 14 games for the 1960 Denver Broncos, mostly at the right guard position.  In August 1961, the Broncos traded Smith to the Oakland Raiders for Gene Prebola.  He was the starting left guard for the 1961 Oakland Raiders, appearing in all 14 games.  He was placed on waivers by the Raiders in late August 1962.

References

1937 births
Living people
American football offensive linemen
Michigan Wolverines football players
Oakland Raiders players
Denver Broncos (AFL) players
Sportspeople from Little Rock, Arkansas
Players of American football from Arkansas
American Football League players